Usman Ashraf can refer to:

 Usman Ashraf (American cricketer) (born 1996)
 Usman Ashraf (Pakistani cricketer) (born 1989)